World Computer Speed Chess Championship is an annual event organized by the International Computer Games Association where computer chess engines compete against each other at blitz chess time controls.  It is held in conjunction with the World Computer Chess Championship. Up to 2001, it was held in conjunction with the World Microcomputer Chess Championship (WMCCC) and restricted to microcomputers.

Championship results

References

External links
Official website of the International Computer Games Association (ICGA)

Paderborn - WMCCC 1995 

Computer
Computer chess competitions